The term Star Wars Legacy may refer to:

Star Wars: Legacy, a 2006 comic book series taking place at 130 A.B.Y.
Legacy of the Force, a book series taking place at 40 A.B.Y.